Mohammed Daud Daud (Persian: محمد داود داود) (January 1969 – 28 May 2011), also known as General Daud Daud, an ethnic Tajik, was the police chief in northern Afghanistan and the commander of the 303 Pamir Corps. He was an opponent of the Afghan Taliban.

Daud studied engineering in college. After graduating from college in the 1991, he defected from the Afghan Army and joined the forces of Ahmad Shah Massoud against the Soviet invasion of Afghanistan. After the retreat of Soviet troops and the defeat of the Afghan communist regime, Daud remained in Takhar province of Afghanistan. Ahmad Shah Massoud had ordered him to guard northern areas and to keep his forces out of the capital Kabul. When the Taliban took power in Kabul, Daud served as a leading military commander of the anti-Taliban United Front under the command of Ahmad Shah Massoud, which later spearheaded the defeat of the Taliban. In October 2001, Daud was directly responsible for retaking the city of Kunduz from an Al Qaeda-Taliban alliance.

After the fall of the Taliban regime, he was appointed a Deputy Interior Minister for Counter Narcotics in Afghanistan. His campaign against opium poppy cultivation was successful in several provinces, including Ogar, Ghazni, Wardak, Paktia, Paktika and Panjshir.

In 2010 he was appointed police chief of Afghanistan's northern provinces, overseeing Interior Ministry forces and directly commanding his own police elite force called Pamir 303. An opponent of the Taliban, Daud was assassinated on 28 May 2011 in a Taliban and Islamic Movement of Uzbekistan (IMU) bomb attack in Taloqan, Afghanistan.

Daud and the Battle of Kunduz 
Daud was responsible for overseeing the November 2001 siege of Kunduz, the last major battle in the assault to topple the Taliban  During the siege of Kunduz all sides of the city were surrounded by Northern Alliance forces. Inside the city there were estimated to be 20,000-30,000 Taliban fighters, many of whom had vowed to fight to the death, rather than surrender. In Kunduz during the November 2001 siege were the so-called "Afghan Arabs", foreign volunteers believed to be led by Osama bin Laden. According to General Mohammed Daud a pro-Taliban leader named "Omar al-Khatab" was leading a force of 1,000 foreign fighters belonging to Osama bin Laden's al-Qaida network. Little was known about the foreign Taliban. According to Afghan Taliban soldiers taken prisoner by the Northern Alliance; the foreigners did not fight side by side with the Taliban, but in separate units, under their own commanders. During the siege the mayor of Kunduz travelled through the surrounding mountains to meet General Mohammed Daud of the Northern Alliance, supposedly in a garden near Taloqan. Following the meeting, the mayor was ready to surrender, but needed time to negotiate with the foreign volunteers, who opposed surrender. In an effort to end the siege, Daud promised the low-ranking Taliban fighters fair treatment if they surrendered: "We will allow the low-ranking foreigners to appear before a court." On 27 November 2001 street-to-street fighting began at 7am in Kunduz, when Northern Alliance troops led by General Mohammed Daud advanced into town. The remaining Taliban were defeated and Kunduz fell into Northern Alliance control. After victory at the siege of Kunduz and the subsequent establishment of the Interim Government in Afghanistan, Daud was appointed as Military commander of Corps No 6 in Kunduz /Kunduz province.

Daud's political career 

Daud was the former governor of the Takhar province in Afghanistan.

Gen. Mohammad Daud was the top counter-narcotics official in the Afghan government. Counternarcotics enforcement activities have been directed from within the Ministry of Interior since 2002. General Mohammed Daud was named Deputy Ministry of Interior for Counternarcotics by Afghan President Hamid Karzai in October 2004. He was also the head of the Counter Narcotics Police of Afghanistan (CNPA). Daud and his staff worked with U.S. and British officials in implementing the Afghan government's expanded counternarcotics enforcement plan. Soon following his appointment, Daud led an Afghan delegation that participated in a thirty night session of the sub-commission on illicit Drug Traffic and related matters in the Near and Middle East (HONLEA) in Beirut, Lebanon. Delegates from twenty-one countries participated in the meeting. General Mohammad Daud delivered a presentation on the counter narcotics activities of the government of Afghanistan, achievements and problems still being faced.

President Hamid Karzai took steps to establish landlocked Afghanistan as a trade hub connecting the Middle East, Central Asia and Europe. Daud was involved in Karzai's plan to rehabilitate the war-torn Afghan economy. In late December 2002 Daud led an economic trade delegation to neighboring Tajikistan. Kabul has been particularly interested in swiftly opening trading routes in Central Asia, where there is a vast market for Afghan goods.

Daud expressed optimism about Afghanistan's effort to halt the opium trade: "We witnessed a remarkable reduction in the level of poppy cultivation all over Afghanistan last year. We worked very hard in the provinces where poppy cultivation was higher last year. The poppy eradication campaign is extensively under way in 11 provinces. Some 45,000 jeribs [9,000 hectares] of poppy cultivated land have so far been cleared. The campaign will start in 11 other provinces soon."

Daud was also involved in Afghanistan's Disbandment of Illegal Armed (DIAG). DIAG is a program within the Afghan Ministry of Interior. DAIG supports the Afghan government's objectives to bring stability to Afghanistan through the continuing process of demilitarization. The program also focuses on removing from office those government officials with proven links to illegal armed groups. Daud said that DIAG is not a program to take only weapons from individuals but that it is a program to disband the armed groups in order to ensure a sustainable safe and secure country.

Fight against Taliban terrorism

Acid attack on Afghan schoolgirls 
On 12 November 2008 attackers in Afghanistan sprayed acid in the faces of at least 15 girls near a school in Kandahar. One of the girls who was attacked was quoted as saying, "We were going to school on foot when two unknown people on a motorcycle came close to us and threw acid in our faces", 16-year-old Atifa told the BBC." At least two of the girls were blinded by the attack. General Mohammad Daud was tasked to deal with the incident. The attack on the girls, who had been wearing all-covering burqas, drew wide condemnation including from President Hamid Karzai and U.S. First Lady Laura Bush.

Daud said authorities had arrested ten men for it a few days after the attack. He said at a press conference that "The attack was the work of the Taliban and we have not finalised our investigation", and told the BBC that "the attack was the work of the Taliban" and that the attackers "were taking orders from the other side of the border [with Pakistan] from those who are leading terrorist attacks in Kandahar." Daud told reporters that the ten Afghans arrested had been promised 100,000 Pakistani rupees (US$1,300) each by Taliban in Pakistan. Many of them confessed to the attacks. Daud said his ministry had opened a bank account to collect money for the girls' medical treatment and education.

Military operations
In March 2011 a BBC crew was embedded with Daud's forces during a battle against the Taliban in Baghlan. The journalist described:

Counter-narcotics campaign

Opium in Afghanistan 
Opium from Afghanistan provides more than 90 per cent of the world's total supply, funding international drug syndicates with billions of US dollars in profits every year.  Daud said that more than 110,000 people were actively involved in drug business across the country. This number had been estimated by the United Nations Office on Drugs and Crimes (UNODC). In June 2007 Daud estimated there were over 1,000 smugglers, including some government officials arrested over the previous three years. Daud stated in an interview: "Our job as a law enforcement agency is to make sure eradication is done and farmers are not cultivating opium poppy.We want to put some 4–5 traffickers in jail from each poppy producing province to make an example ... The other side is the poverty of the farmers. We, the Afghan state, will do our part; there will be no more poppy cultivation. But it is the responsibility of the big donors to provide alternative livelihoods, alternative crops and development to the farmers, both short term and long term." The head of the UN's drugs agency said in 2010 that the Taliban had made $US100 million the previous year by levying a 10% tax on opium-growing farmers. In response to the illicit opium trade, Daud reported that counter-narcotics activities had been "boosted considerably" since 2007.  During the first eight months of 2007, over 300 tonnes of cannabis, over 25 tonnes of opium and over 10 tonnes of heroin, as well as several tonnes of heroin-producing chemicals, were impounded. Twenty-five heroin-producing laboratories were also destroyed, according to the Interior Ministry.

In December 2008 Daud spoke at a U.N. conference in Kabul, Afghanistan, and said that Afghan law enforcement agencies needed international assistance in training and equipment. He talked about lack of security and linkage between drug-trafficking and terrorism as well as profound corruption in the police and the army. His presentation highlighted the Ministry of the Interior's strategy in the field of counternarcotics. These included dismantling drug-trafficking networks/organizations, poppy eradication and crop substitution. Daud informed the participants that the "poppy eradication force" would complete its training soon and would be deployed to the southern provinces of Afghanistan. He noted that the force would be responsible for manually eradicating poppy plantations. He called for international support to continue with the poppy eradication programme and to expand the crop substitution programme to other provinces. The General suggested posting liaison officers to Pakistan, Iran and Tajikistan in order to foster international cooperation. Afghanistan had signed agreements with a number of countries and was in the process of signing memorandums of understanding with neighboring countries aimed at improving cooperation, information-sharing, and controlled delivery operations, according to the General. His ministry's activities in strengthening security at the borders and airports and establishing border control liaison officers were also emphasized.

In February 2009 Daud said that he was hopeful that the poppy crop production in Afghanistan would probably drop by 50 per cent that year. He said that Taliban and smugglers had joined, and posed a bigger threat to the Afghan government. Counter-narcotics police came under enemy attack during the counter-narcotics drive in several occasions, inflicting casualties on the law-enforcers, he said. The campaign against poppy was successful in Logar, Ghazni, Wardag, Paktia, Paktika and Panjshir provinces.

Taliban and opium

The opium trade has been a continuing source of financing for the Taliban. Taliban insurgents force farmers to grow opium poppies to fund their operations. Daud was recently quoted as saying, "The Taliban have forged an alliance with drug smugglers, providing protection for drug convoys and mounting attacks to keep the government away and the poppy flourishing." General Mohammad Daud was further quoted in The New Yorker about this alliance, saying, "There has been a coalition between the Taliban and the opium smugglers. This year, they have set up a commission to tax the harvest." In return, he said, the Taliban had offered opium farmers protection from the government's eradication efforts. The switch in strategy has an obvious logic: it provides opium money for the Taliban to sustain itself and helps it to win over the farming communities.  In a continued effort to curb the opium trade in Afghanistan Mohammed Duad reported in June 2008 that police in Kabul set fire to 7.5 tonnes of narcotics. In April 2009, the Afghan anti-drug officers burned more than six-and-a-half tons of seized heroin, opium, hashish and drug-manufacturing chemicals worth up to £70 million on the UK market.  "If we do not burn the drugs, thousands of others will become drug addicts", said Daud, deputy minister for counter narcotics at the Interior Ministry. By burning this amount of opium and narcotics we show the people we are committed to the fight against drugs."

Mobile opium processing labs 
Reports seem to suggest Afghan drug traffickers are turning to new concealment methods. Mobile processing labs started to be seen at the end of 2003 and beginning of 2004. These processing labs can be difficult to locate. According to Daud "reports and tip-offs" have to be relied on in order to find them. Daud added: "Previously, they were using wood in their big laboratories. They could not move [them] and we started to find their laboratories, so they decided to make all their laboratories into mobile labs so they can carry them to different places. They started using gas and diesel [as fuel]."  Afghan counter-narcotics police point to key smugglers having strong links with processing laboratories and say that laboratories are sometimes heavily guarded.

"They have a lot of weapons, and in some areas they are supported by government officials," said Daud, although he would not reveal in which areas guarded laboratories had been a particular problem. A Kandahar resident who has had close contact with the drugs trade said that laboratories, often just comprising metal drums and a large press, are mainly located in the border areas. The location of laboratories in these areas points to the involvement of Pakistani chemists.

Death
Daud was assassinated in a Taliban bomb attack in Taloqan, after a meeting held in the headquarters of the provincial governor of Takhar Province. Six people, including two German soldiers, were killed. The commander of ISAF troops in North Afghanistan, General Markus Kneip, was wounded. The Taliban claimed responsibility for the attack, with the Islamic Movement of Uzbekistan also believed to have played a role.

Narcotics trade allegations

Daud was accused of being involved in the narcotics trade and using his post as head of the counternarcotics police to provide safe passage to smugglers.

References

1969 births
2011 deaths
Government ministers of Afghanistan
Afghan Tajik people
People murdered in Afghanistan
People killed by the Taliban
Deaths by explosive device
Governors of Takhar Province
Afghan military officers